Simon Grimsby (1367 – after 1407) from Grimsby, Lincolnshire, was an English politician.

Grimsby was Mayor of Grimsby in 1400–1402. He was a Member (MP) of the Parliament of England for Great Grimsby in 1407.

References

1367 births
15th-century deaths
English MPs 1407
Mayors of Grimsby
Members of the Parliament of England for Great Grimsby